This is a list of Live! with Regis and Kelly and Live! with Kelly episodes which were broadcast during the show's 24th season.  The list is ordered by air date.

Although the co-hosts may have read a couple of emails during the broadcast, it does not necessarily count as an "Inbox" segment.

LIVE! with Regis and Kelly

September 2011

October 2011

November 2011

LIVE! with Kelly (2011-2012)

November 2011

December 2011

January 2012

February 2012

March 2012

April 2012

May 2012

June 2012

July 2012

August 2012

References 

2011 American television seasons
2012 American television seasons